Whitgift is a small linear village in the East Riding of Yorkshire, England approximately  east of Goole. It is located alongside the River Ouse and north of the A161 road between Goole and Scunthorpe. Ousefleet and Reedness are to the east and west respectively. It forms part of the civil parish of Twin Rivers. Historically Whitgift was part of the West Riding of Yorkshire.

Features
There was for many years a Whitgift ferry, which may originally have predated the village.

Church

The Church of Mary Magdalene (on the Whitgift side of the border between Whitgift and Reedness) dates from 1304 (replacing an earlier building, 11th–12th century or earlier). It has a famous clock with an unusual feature: instead of 12 (XII in Roman numerals) it has a 13 (XIII). Reasons vary, but local rumour relates that it may be due to the church being adjacent to a pub (now closed) at which the painter imbibed before completing the job. The church was designated a Grade I listed building in 1967 and is now recorded in the National Heritage List for England, maintained by Historic England.

Hall
Whitgift is also notable for Whitgift Hall, a grade II* listed Georgian manor house built in 1704 by a family called Stephenson. Since it was built, it has undergone significant change. For example, bay windows were added and the current owners have a caravan site and fishing pond.

Lighthouse

It remains operational, a waymark for ships travelling to and from Goole docks, and is Grade II listed.

Other
Other features include a Methodist chapel, but Whitgift mainly consists of a sparse strip of houses spread out over its length bounded by the River Ouse to the north and fields to the south looking towards Eastoft.

History

The place-name 'Whitgift' is first attested in a Yorkshire charter of circa 1080, where it appears as Witegift, and in a charter of 1232 where it appears as Whitegift. The name is thought to mean 'Hviti's or Hwita's gift'.

Whitgift was previously a civil parish that was part of the Goole Rural District in the West Riding of Yorkshire from 1894 to 1974, then in Boothferry district of Humberside until 1996.

References

External links

 The Ancient Parish of Whitgift
 Whitgift's entry on Goole On The Web
 The clock which counts to 13

Villages in the East Riding of Yorkshire